The 1971–72 Bradford City A.F.C. season was the 59th in the club's history.

The club finished 24th in Division Three (being related to Division Four), reached the 1st round of the FA Cup, and the 1st round of the League Cup.

Sources

References

Bradford City A.F.C. seasons
Bradford City